State Road 508 (NM 508) is a  state highway in the US state of New Mexico. NM 508's western terminus is at NM 206 north of Tatum, and the eastern terminus is at NM 125 northeast of Tatum.

Major intersections

See also

References

508
Transportation in Lea County, New Mexico